Randolph is a census-designated place and unincorporated community  in Pontotoc County, Mississippi. State highway 9 by-passes the center of Randolph, which can be accessed by turning onto Randolph Loop, County Road 188.  Mostly an agriculture and timber community, there are many farms, sawmills, and even a cotton gin owned by BHF Farms located there.  Also, there is a large Amish community nearby, the only one in the deep south.

Randolph High School was opened in 1937.  RHS provided education for all students for grades 1 through 12.  Basketball was the main sport and athletes participated in track and field also.  The sports were limited because of the small size of the school, although they did create a football team circa 1965.  The mascot for RHS was a "Rambler" which was represented by a line sketch of a tramp with his pack slung over his shoulder on a stick.  Randolph High School was closed in 1971 due to school consolidations.  The building remained until 2009 when the owner had it demolished brick by brick by Amish workers using a horse and cart.  The stone building which was the home economics/agriculture center for Randolph High School still exists and has been used as a Community Center for the community of Randolph.

The Original Post Office is located at the junction of Randolph Loop (CR 188) and Topsy Rd., (CR 855).

"Randolph Day" is held on the first Saturday in October at the Community Center. Anyone who ever attended RHS, whether they graduated from RHS or not, meets at the Community Center.  It is a social event where those who have moved away catch up on community events and the activities of their fellow Ramblers, and perhaps meet a classmate they have not seen for 30 years.  People bring food and have a meal together.  After lunch people group together by class and stand up class by class to let everyone else know who is there from what year.  Members of the original graduating class, as well as some of the original teachers and founders of the school, were still attending as of 2009.

It was first named as a CDP in the 2020 Census which listed a population of 197.

Demographics

2020 census

Note: the US Census treats Hispanic/Latino as an ethnic category. This table excludes Latinos from the racial categories and assigns them to a separate category. Hispanics/Latinos can be of any race.

Education
It is in the Pontotoc County School District.

References

Unincorporated communities in Pontotoc County, Mississippi
Unincorporated communities in Mississippi
Census-designated places in Pontotoc County, Mississippi